Coast FM is a Tasmanian community radio station broadcasting all across the North-West coast from the studio in Wynyard. The station's hosts are volunteers.

History
Coast FM was previously known as Coastal FM.

Volunteering
The station is run by a number of volunteers who dedicate their time to supply programs each week.

Programming

The station's programmes are aimed at the general community. A mixture of old and new music is played through the day and evening. Most programmes include news and weather as well as competitions. There are several multilingual programmes such as Monday's  The Celtic Connection. Band and Classical music is played every Sunday morning. The Station's Sport Director brings to the area all the local sport each Saturday morning and when a major event is being held.

Frequencies
7DBS 88.9 MHz Broadcasts from Smithton and covers all of Circular Head.
7DBS 104.7 MHz Broadcasts from Devonport and covers many surrounding towns.
7DBS 106.1 MHz Broadcasts from Wynyard and covers the North West Coast.

Website
The station streams online using a free shoutcast provider.

External links
 http://www.coastfm.org/ Station Website ( under construction )
  mp3
 Coast FM on Facebook

Radio stations in Tasmania
Community radio stations in Australia